Below is the list of current United States of America Fin Swimming National Records. The records are ratified by the Underwater Society of America and USA Fin Swimming.

Long course meters (senior records)

Men 

The records listed are correct as of Jan 19, 2015.

Women

See also
Finswimming in the United States

References

United States
Finswimming
Finswimming
finswimming